Fair Lawn is a borough in Bergen County, in the U.S. state of New Jersey, and a bedroom suburb located  northwest of New York City. As of the 2020 United States census, the borough's population was 34,927, an increase of 2,470 (+7.6%) from the 2010 census count of 32,457, which in turn reflected an increase of 820 (+2.6%) from the 31,637 counted at the 2000 census.

Fair Lawn was incorporated as a borough by an act of the New Jersey Legislature on March 6, 1924, as "Fairlawn", from portions of Saddle River Township. The name was taken from Fairlawn, David Acker's estate home, that was built in 1865 and later became the Fair Lawn Municipal Building. In 1933, the official spelling of the borough's name was split into its present two-word form as "Fair Lawn" Borough.

Radburn, one of the first planned communities in the United States, is an unincorporated community located within Fair Lawn and was founded in 1929 as "a town for the motor age." Fair Lawn is home to a large number of commuters to New York City, to which it is connected by train from two railroad stations on NJ Transit's Bergen County Line, the Radburn and Broadway stations.

Fair Lawn's motto, coined by Jake Janso, is "A great place to visit and a better place to live." Fair Lawn has been rated as one of the top 10 best places to live in New Jersey. According to Nerdwallet, Fair Lawn witnessed a 5.3% increase in its working-age population between 2009 and 2011.

History and historical significance
The first settlers of Fair Lawn were members of the Lenape tribe, of Native Americans, a group of hunter gatherers who eventually sold their land to incoming Dutch and Irish settlers and migrated to Pennsylvania. The new colonists turned the region, part of the New Barbadoes Township, into five large farm lots, conjoined by two main roads—Paramus and Saddle River—and named it "slooterdam" (after a V-shaped sluice-like fishing weir built in the Passaic River by the Lenni Lenape). The name stuck until 1791. In the 1800s, these five lots became nine smaller lots, and three new roads—Fair Lawn Avenue, Lincoln Avenue, and Prospect Street—were constructed to encourage mobility between them. Eighty houses were built by 1861, and the renamed Small Lots, now a part of the Saddle River Township and home to multiple vegetable and fruit farms and dairies, became an agricultural community. Berdan Avenue, a new road located near five Berdan family farms, was soon added and Victorian homes were built alongside it and in nearby areas. The grandest of the estates, perched atop a hill by Small Lots Road was David Acker's estate "Fairlawn", from which the township gets its name (Images of America, Page 7).

Rapid suburban development of the town occurred in three sections: the River Road-Fair Lawn Avenue area known as "Memorial Park", the area at Lincoln Avenue and Wagaraw Road known as "Columbus Heights", and the area east of the railroad and south of Broadway, known as Warren Point. The development of this section was catalyzed by the "establishment of a post office, a railroad station, and a trolley to the Hudson River" (Images of America, Page 8).

In the 1900s, Fair Lawn residents were displeased about the schooling situation as part of Saddle River Township; the schools were either dilapidated or too far away for Fair Lawn residents, and citizens felt that they were not getting schools comparable to the tax money they were paying. As such, a movement to separate from Saddle River Township was born. Fair Lawn residents petitioned to the state, asking to incorporate as an independent borough, and in April 1924, the borough of Fair Lawn was voted into existence.

Fair Lawn is home to the following eight sites listed on the National Register of Historic Places:
 Peter Garretson House, 4-02 River Road (1974)
 Irregular pattern between Radburn Road and the Erie Rail Road tracks in Radburn (1975)
 G.V.H. Berdan House, 1219 River Road (1983)
 Richard J. Berdan House, 2407 Fair Lawn Avenue
 Cadmus-Folly House, 19-21 Fair Lawn Avenue
 Naugle House, 42-49 Dunkerhook Road – Built in the 1750s, the house was acquired by the borough.
 Jacob Vanderbeck Jr. House, 41-25 Dunkerhook Road – Constructed in 1754, the house was named by Preservation New Jersey as one of New Jersey's 10 most endangered historic places
 Radburn station, Pollitt Drive (1984)

Other sites, in addition to those listed above, are also considered historic by the Historic Sites Survey Committee of the Bergen County Historic Sites Advisory Board, including:
 Henry A. Hopper House
 George Washington School (Recommended as a National Register possibility, but needs further documentation)
 Fair Lawn, Berdan, and Prospect Avenues, Plaza and Radburn Roads
 Peter Demarest House on Fair Lawn Avenue
 Warren Bronze and Aluminum Factory on Second Street

In July 1982, an NJ Transit train derailed and crashed into a pasta factory, killing the train's engineer. The derailment resulted from a group of teens who had tampered with the tracks. Two of the five youths charged with the crime were convicted of manslaughter for their roles in the incident and were given five-year sentences in a state correctional facility.

Geography
According to the United States Census Bureau, the borough had a total area of 5.22 square miles (13.53 km2), including 5.14 square miles (13.30 km2) of land and 0.09 square miles (0.23 km2) of water (1.70%).

The borough borders Paterson (in Passaic County, across the Passaic River) to the west; Hawthorne across Lincoln Avenue to the West; Glen Rock across Harristown Road, Maple Avenue, the northern border of the former Nabisco plant and its extension north of Garwood Road and Naugle Drive to the north; Ridgewood across the Saddle River to the northeast; Paramus across the Saddle River to the east; Rochelle Park across another point in the Saddle River to the southeast; with Saddle Brook across the two longer portions of South Broadway and their extensions through Rosario Court to the south; and Elmwood Park across the Bergen County Line, New Jersey Route 4 (Broadway), Cyril Avenue and Willow Street to the south. The hills of Wyckoff are visible from the northern neighborhoods of Fair Lawn.

Neighborhoods
Fair Lawn is an incorporated collection of diverse neighborhoods, each with its own distinct character and vibe. Unincorporated communities, localities and place names located partially or completely within the borough include:

Berdan Grove, a residential neighborhood of single-family homes behind Thomas Jefferson Middle School, surrounding Berdan Grove Park on Berdan Avenue. This neighborhood is home to the borough's highest concentration of Asian Americans and includes Milnes Elementary School.
Broadway District contains the major commercial thoroughfare of Broadway and houses the Broadway District commuter stop for NJ Transit's Bergen County Line train. Roughly located around the Warren Point and Lyncrest areas, the district also extends as far as Morlot Avenue along the tracks, roughly around or a little after Glen Rock Lumber, housing many industries on Banta Place. The Broadway District is mainly a shopping district as it contains many stores, eateries, hobby centers, salons, and other businesses. Not only is it the largest stretch of stores within Fair Lawn, it also houses one of the highest densities of nail and beauty salons in the United States. The Broadway District stretches from the Route 4 split with Route 208 and continues all through Fair Lawn and includes a few blocks of Elmwood Park. Broadway also hosts the route of local Paterson-New York Spanish Company minibuses, known locally as guaguas, as a cheaper alternative for commuters to and from New York. It is one of only a handful of Bergen-Passaic-Hudson districts that even offers this service.
Central Fair Lawn is bounded by Morlot and Fair Lawn Avenues on the south and north, respectively, by River Road on the west, and Route 208 on the east and northeast. The borough's Municipal Complex, which houses its administrative, legal, financial, and police divisions, is located in this neighborhood, as are the Fair Lawn Public Library, Fair Lawn High School, and John A. Forrest Elementary School.
 Dunkerhook, the Dark Corner (Donckerhoek in old Dutch), is on both sides of a former bridge over the Saddle River, in Fair Lawn and Paramus, near Fair Lawn Avenue. The Vanderbeck and Naugle houses there are both from the 18th century.
 The Heights, more precisely known as "Columbia Heights", is located near Hawthorne's industrial section along the Passaic River on Wagaraw Road and Hawthorne's residential area at Lincoln Avenue as well as bordering Bunker Hill in Paterson. This well-maintained neighborhood houses some local industry outside of the McBride Industrial District that borders Glen Rock and is known by some of its residents as the "Bunker Hill Extension" or the "Walsh Area".
Hendersonville, also referred to as "Riverside East". This diverse neighborhood, located between Columbia Heights and the Municipal Complex within the "Westmoreland District", as well as sharing Route 208 with the neighboring borough of Glen Rock, is a mostly residential community of two-family Cape Cod-style houses located down the stretch of Henderson Boulevard curving around to 11th Street. Distinct to this neighborhood in comparison with other two-family districts and sections is that each Cape Cod has two doors in the front so each residing family has its own entrance into its respective quarters, a blueprint that was abandoned shortly after being built in favor of a "one door, two entrances" model. Westmoreland Elementary School is located in this neighborhood.
 Lyncrest neighborhood, located south of Morlot Avenue, in alignment with Paterson's 33rd Street split into that city's Upper Eastside and Eastside neighborhoods, is an extension of the Eastside and notable for its older, stone houses in the footsteps of homes once owned by Paterson's former silk barons. This community is also diverse, with immigrants from Europe, Asia, the Middle East, as well as various parts of the Americas. It is home to many Orthodox Jewish, Indian American, and Russian American families, among other ethnic and religious groups. Lyncrest streets "1st-6th" are also known by the name of "Rivercrest" by locals, due to the split level and Cape Cod-style architecture of housing located in the "River Dip" adjacent to Memorial Park. Lyncrest Elementary School is located in this neighborhood.
 McBride Industrial District is the area incorporating the McBride Industrial Park located between Fair Lawn Borough's border with Glen Rock and the Chandler Houses and Fair Lawn Commons communities. It currently houses the former Nabisco cookie factory, which has played a major role in not only Fair Lawn's identity itself, but also Glen Rock, Ridgewood, Paterson, Prospect Park, Haledon, Hawthorne, and Western Paramus near the Dunkerhook and Saddle River Areas, causing those venturing throughout these areas to coin the nickname "Cookie-City" as a general area term, describing the fragrance of freshly baked cookies that filled these areas on baking days. In the past, the McBride Industrial District took up both sides of Route 208, stretching from Fair Lawn Avenue to the intersection at Maple Avenue and Harristown Road, running up to the Bergen County Line train tracks via the Radburn District, and housing companies such as Nabisco, Kodak, Maxell, and others. More recently the district has been in the process of deindustrialization and corporate gentrification, as older companies fold or move out, replacing industrial properties with residential-commercial "mini-cities", as well as the headquarters of New Jersey's Columbia Savings Bank.
 Memorial Park, a working-class neighborhood (sometimes called the "River Dip", "East River Area","Eastside Dip", "Riverside", or the more modern "Yang"; the aerial view of the neighborhood makes a "Ying Yang" symbol with neighboring East Side Park) within and around the River Road Improvement District with street addresses aligned with the corner of 33rd Street and Martin Luther King Way (Broadway) in neighboring Paterson. The Memorial Park neighborhood borders the Passaic River and contains the park next to Memorial Middle School named Memorial Park which houses a World War II Memorial commemorating those who fought in the war. The park is the terminus of the annual Memorial Day parade and the site of the Memorial pool and beach as well as the Independence Day fireworks show. Residential gentrification is occurring with the leveling of two-family rental housing for more modern single-family housing in this area. 
 Radburn is a planned community also housing the landmark Radburn Plaza building, which was destroyed in a fire in 2002 and subsequently rebuilt. With its safe and easy access to local businesses and schools, and Fair Lawn's largest U.S. Postal Service branch, this neighborhood also offers commuter trains from Radburn station to the Secaucus Junction rail transfer station as well as to the PATH train in Hoboken, both of which provide rail connections to New York City. This neighborhood includes Radburn Elementary School and Daly Field. An annual street fair is held here in June.
 Radrock Estates is a small neighborhood around two streets, Well Drive and Split Rock Road, with a private park within the block they enclose, reminiscent of nearby Radburn but a separate development built about 1940. The entrance street from Fair Lawn Avenue has an entrance pillar on each side displaying the name. The surrounding area to the north and east, while built after World War II, is considered to be an extended part of Radrock Estates. Although it is a very diverse residential section, this neighborhood shares the conveniences of living in Radburn including dining, retail access, as well as rail access from Radburn Station.
 The River Road Improvement District, with an annual street fair in autumn, houses many functional businesses, including numerous banks, ethnic restaurants and supermarkets, small offices, retail telecommunications outlets, both a United Parcel Service store and a U.S. Post Office branch, and the landmark Joker's Child comic book store. River Road in this district is also zoned for apartments located above businesses.
 Warren Point, a residential area located near the Broadway Improvement District. Bordering Saddle Brook and Elmwood Park, it has many stores, big and small, and many eateries. The neighborhood also offers commuter trains from Broadway station to Hoboken's PATH and to Secaucus Junction via the Bergen County Line, as well as the "Paterson-New York Shuttle". Warren Point Elementary School and the private St. Anne School are located in this neighborhood.

Other neighborhoods in the borough include "Fair Lawn Commons" (The Commons) off Route 208, located within the Radburn Historical District, yet which has a separate, more affluent feel and modern look and subculture; Radburn's El Dorado Village, which is known for its Eastern European immigrant residents; and just to its west, the "Chandler Houses". Fair Lawn's newest neighborhood is Fair Lawn Promenade (The Promenade), a mixed-use development extending northward from The Commons along Highway 208 North, consisting of apartments, shops, offices, and restaurants, with the motto to be able to "live, shop, work, and play" in one locale.

These distinct communities are located throughout the borough, and each has its own character, making Fair Lawn not just ethnically, racially, and religiously diverse, but also an experientially diverse borough notable even amidst Bergen County's diversity on a larger scale.

Ethnic diversity
Fair Lawn has a longstanding tradition of ethnic diversity and a tolerance for people of different ethnicities and religious faiths. Continuing steady immigration from Eurasia, Asia, Europe, and Latin America has transformed Fair Lawn into an international melting pot, and over 50 languages and dialects are spoken in the borough.

History of ethnic diversity
Fair Lawn has been a center for Jewish culture over a period spanning several decades. Since the early 2000s, the Orthodox Jewish population has been increasing significantly and has replaced the earlier decreases in members of the non-Orthodox Jewish sects. After the collapse of the Soviet Union in 1991, Russian Jews began to migrate to Fair Lawn. Fair Lawn's Jewish American population has therefore maintained an at least one-third presence overall for several decades. Russian Jews were then followed by Russian Orthodox Christians. Over 10% of the borough's population is of Russian descent, the highest of any community in New Jersey, and increasing with continued migration of Russian Americans from Brooklyn. The size of Fair Lawn's Russian American presence prompted an April Fool's satire titled, "Putin Moves Against Fair Lawn". Fair Lawn also has the largest Israeli American community in Bergen County. On November 22, 2015, the Jewish Historical Society of North Jersey celebrated the grand opening of a permanent home at 17-10 River Road in Fair Lawn, after being housed at various locations, mostly in neighboring Paterson, for decades.

Fair Lawn has historically also had a large Italian American population, 19.7% in 2000, but this number is decreasing as the descendants of the original Italian immigrants are being displaced by immigrants from around the globe.

Newer immigrants

A magnet for immigrants
Fair Lawn's reputable school district, safe and well-policed neighborhoods, and the borough's convenient access to commercial centers and hospitals, a complex network of highways, transit lines, New York City, and Newark Liberty International Airport, have all made Fair Lawn a magnet for new immigrants from several regions around the world. The 2012 American Community Survey conducted by the Census Bureau showed a significant increase in the Asian American population, including the Asian Indian, Filipino American, Chinese American, Korean American, and Vietnamese American populations, and the Polish American population is also growing. The public library in Fair Lawn holds storytelling programs in Hindi and Hebrew languages, while Mandarin Chinese has been taught in the school district since the 2007–2008 school year.

A number of places for congregation cater to different nationalities in Fair Lawn, including three Korean churches, one Taiwanese church, Young Israel of Fair Lawn, Saint Leon Armenian Church, and the (Italian American) Cosmos Club of Fair Lawn. Several Filipino organizations are based in Fair Lawn. Between the 2010 Census and the 2013–2017 American Community Survey, Fair Lawn's Filipino population was estimated to have increased by more than 50% (from 626 in 2010 to 952 in 2013–2017).

Immigrants from former Soviet Union
Given the established presence of Russian Americans in the borough, immigrant nationalities native to other republics of the Former Soviet Union, including Ukrainian Americans, Georgian Americans, Armenian Americans, and Uzbek Americans have also established an increasing presence in Fair Lawn.

As a suburb of New York City, Fair Lawn has a diverse population. The town has a high Jewish immigration population, as well as Muslim immigrants, including Albanian Americans and Macedonian Americans, as well as Latino Americans, including Peruvian Americans and Stateside Puerto Ricans, have settled in Fair Lawn's western flank, in the Memorial Park neighborhood between the River Road Improvement District and the Passaic River, where there is also a small but stable African American minority.

Demographics

2010 census

The Census Bureau's 2006–2010 American Community Survey showed that (in 2010 inflation-adjusted dollars) median household income was $92,727 (with a margin of error of +/− $4,701) and the median family income was $112,650 (+/− $5,760). Males had a median income of $70,990 (+/− $3,246) versus $54,358 (+/− $2,815) for females. The per capita income for the borough was $40,146 (+/− $1,700). About 2.1% of families and 3.4% of the population were below the poverty line, including 4.3% of those under age 18 and 6.3% of those age 65 or over.

Same-sex couples headed 64 households in 2010, an increase from the 49 counted in 2000.

2000 census
As of the 2000 United States census there were 31,637 people, 11,806 households, and 8,901 families residing in the borough. The population density was 6,121.0 people per square mile (2,362.7/km2). There were 12,006 housing units at an average density of 2,322.9 per square mile (896.6/km2). The racial makeup of the borough was 91.54% Caucasian, 4.92% Asian, 0.74% Black or African American, 0.04% Native American, 1.37% from other races, and 1.38% reporting two or more races. Hispanics or Latinos of any race were 5.51% of the population.

There were 11,806 households, out of which 33.4% had children under the age of 18 living with them, 63.5% were married couples living together, 9.0% had a female householder with no husband present, and 24.6% were non-families. 21.3% of all households were made up of individuals, and 12.3% had someone living alone who was 65 years of age or older. The average household size was 2.67 and the average family size was 3.12.

In the borough the population was spread out, with 22.8% under the age of 18, 6.0% from 18 to 24, 26.9% from 25 to 44, 25.6% from 45 to 64, and 18.7% who were 65 years of age or older. The median age was 42 years. For every 100 females, there were 90.6 males. For every 100 females age 18 and over, there were 87.7 males.

The median income for a household in the borough was $72,127, and the median income for a family was $81,220. Males had a median income of $56,798 versus $41,300 for females. The per capita income for the borough was $32,273. About 2.6% of families and 3.7% of the population were below the poverty line, including 2.7% of those under age 18 and 6.9% of those age 65 or over.

Economy
Businesses headquartered or located in Fair Lawn include:

A major cookie/bakery/office operation of Nabisco/Mondelēz International, located along Route 208 North, had been the borough's largest employer and taxpayer for more than 60 years, until its shutdown was announced in 2021 when the company sent termination notices to employees.

U.S. Technologies, a high-precision electronics corporation, is headquartered in Fair Lawn.

Columbia Bank (New Jersey), the fourth largest mutual financial institution in the United States, and the largest mutual bank domiciled within the State of New Jersey, is also headquartered in Fair Lawn.

Thermal energy storage company CALMAC of Fair Lawn had performed about 4,000 commercial air-cooling installations in 37 countries by 2014.

Danbee Investigations, a global detective agency, is based in Fair Lawn.

A. Zerega's Sons Inc., founded in 1848 in Brooklyn and currently based in Fair Lawn, describes itself as the fifth-largest pasta maker in the United States, producing 100 million pounds of pasta annually.

The Filipino American Festival, a non-profit corporation describing its mission to include educating Filipino Americans to engage in community partnership, is headquartered in Fair Lawn. The company presents the annual Filipino-American Festival in Bergenfield in eastern Bergen County.

Kuiken Brothers, a major supplier of residential and commercial building materials in the New York City metropolitan area, is headquartered in Fair Lawn.

Fair Lawn Promenade is a mixed-use retail / residential / business complex that opened on April 1, 2014. It has shops, restaurants, condominium rooms, and offices. Businesses there include the first East Coast location of The Habit Burger Grill as well as the first Noodles & Company in New Jersey. TKL, an international clinical research company, is also located there.

Sports
Fair Lawn has one of the original organized street hockey/DekHockey programs in the state. The Fair Lawn Flyers competed in the first national street hockey championships in 1976 in Leominster, Massachusetts.

Fair Lawn Lanes includes 32 bowling lanes, an arcade, and a lounge.

Parks and recreation
Parks in Fair Lawn include:
 Dietch's Kiddie Zoo is a former children's zoo that opened in 1951. It also included kiddie rides and a train ride. The zoo closed in 1967.
 Memorial Park – located on 1st Street, which has an inline skating rink, playing fields, basketball courts, and a beach park.
 Berdan Grove Park – located on Berdan Avenue, home of the John Alaimo Field for baseball, basketball courts, walking paths, and a playground.
 Gregory Park – located on 28th Street, which has a basketball court, playground, baseball field, and a walking path.

Government

Local government
Fair Lawn operates within the Faulkner Act (formally known as the Optional Municipal Charter Law) under the Council-Manager plan E form of New Jersey municipal government, as implemented as of January 1, 1986, based on direct petition. The borough is one of 42 municipalities (of the 564) statewide that use this form of government. The governing body is comprised of a five-member Borough Council. Members of the Borough Council serve four-year terms in office and are elected at-large in partisan elections in odd-numbered years on a staggered basis, with either two or three seats coming up for election every other year as part of the November general election. All policy making power is concentrated in the council. At an annual reorganization meeting held after each election, the council selects a mayor, a deputy mayor, and a deputy mayor for community affairs from among its members. The mayor presides over its meetings with no separate policy-making power. A borough manager is appointed by the council to serve as the municipal chief executive and administrative official.

, the members of the Borough Council are Mayor Kurt Peluso (D, term on council and as mayor ends December 31, 2023), Deputy Mayor Kris Krause (D, term on council and as deputy mayor ends 2023), Deputy Mayor of Community Affairs Cristina Cutrone (D, term on council and as deputy mayor ends 2023), Joshua Reinitz (D, 2025) and Gail Friedberg Rottenstrich (D, 2025).

In May 2018, the Borough Council appointed Cristina Cutrone to fill the seat expiring in December 2019 that was vacated by Mayor Lisa Swain when she took office in the General Assembly; Kurt Peluso replaced Swain as mayor and in turn Gail Rottenstrich replaced him as deputy mayor. Cutrone served on the council on an interim basis until the November 2018 general election, when she was elected to serve the balance of the term of office.

Regular Borough Council meetings are televised on local cable TV when held in the council chambers in the Fair Lawn Municipal Building. Work sessions, where laws are discussed and prepared for adoption, are not usually televised.

Boards and commissions
Fair Lawn's government extends beyond the Council and departments in the form of the following boards and commissions, which are generally staffed by volunteers appointed by the Mayor and Council:

Alliance for Substance Abuse Prevention
American with Disabilities Advisory Committee
Arts Council
Broadway Special Improvement District 
Cadmus House Museum 
Environmental Commission 
Garden Committee 
Green Team Advisory Committee
Historic Preservation Commission 
Open Space Committee
Planning Board 
Property Maintenance 
Rent Leveling Board
River Road Improvement Corporation 
Shade Tree Advisory Committee
Zoning Board

Federal, state and county representation
Fair Lawn is located in New Jersey's 5th Congressional District and is part of New Jersey's 38th state legislative district.

Politics

As of March 2011, there were a total of 20,302 registered voters in Fair Lawn, of which 7,150 (35.2% vs. 31.7% countywide) were registered as Democrats, 3,613 (17.8% vs. 21.1%) were registered as Republicans and 9,528 (46.9% vs. 47.1%) were registered as Unaffiliated. There were 11 voters registered as Libertarians or Greens. Among the borough's 2010 Census population, 62.6% (vs. 57.1% in Bergen County) were registered to vote, including 80.2% of those ages 18 and over (vs. 73.7% countywide).

In the 2016 presidential election, Democrat Hillary Clinton received 8,993 votes (53.6% vs. 54.2% countywide), ahead of Republican Donald Trump with 7,062 votes (42.1% vs. 41.1%) and other candidates with 709 votes (4.2% vs. 4.6%), among the 16,875 ballots cast by the borough's 22,745 registered voters, for a turnout of 74.2% (vs. 72.5% in Bergen County). In the 2012 presidential election, Democrat Barack Obama received 8,374 votes (54.1% vs. 54.8% countywide), ahead of Republican Mitt Romney with 6,815 votes (44.0% vs. 43.5%) and other candidates with 188 votes (1.2% vs. 0.9%), among the 15,473 ballots cast by the borough's 21,563 registered voters, for a turnout of 71.8% (vs. 70.4% in Bergen County). In the 2008 presidential election, Democrat Barack Obama received 8,834 votes (53.2% vs. 53.9% countywide), ahead of Republican John McCain with 7,464 votes (45.0% vs. 44.5%) and other candidates with 147 votes (0.9% vs. 0.8%), among the 16,595 ballots cast by the borough's 21,378 registered voters, for a turnout of 77.6% (vs. 76.8% in Bergen County). In the 2004 presidential election, Democrat John Kerry received 8,745 votes (54.3% vs. 51.7% countywide), ahead of Republican George W. Bush with 7,177 votes (44.6% vs. 47.2%) and other candidates with 118 votes (0.7% vs. 0.7%), among the 16,102 ballots cast by the borough's 20,372 registered voters, for a turnout of 79.0% (vs. 76.9% in the whole county).

In the 2013 gubernatorial election, Republican Chris Christie received 57.1% of the vote (5,377 cast), ahead of Democrat Barbara Buono with 41.8% (3,932 votes), and other candidates with 1.1% (100 votes), among the 9,642 ballots cast by the borough's 20,718 registered voters (233 ballots were spoiled), for a turnout of 46.5%. In the 2009 gubernatorial election, Democrat Jon Corzine received 5,503 ballots cast (51.1% vs. 48.0% countywide), ahead of Republican Chris Christie with 4,590 votes (42.6% vs. 45.8%), Independent Chris Daggett with 521 votes (4.8% vs. 4.7%) and other candidates with 71 votes (0.7% vs. 0.5%), among the 10,763 ballots cast by the borough's 20,714 registered voters, yielding a 52.0% turnout (vs. 50.0% in the county).

Education
The Fair Lawn Public Schools serves students in kindergarten through twelfth grade. As of the 2018–19 school year, the district, comprised of nine schools, had an enrollment of 5,138 students and 409.5 classroom teachers (on an FTE basis), for a student–teacher ratio of 12.5:1. Schools in the district (with 2018–19 enrollment data from the National Center for Education Statistics.) are 
John A. Forrest Elementary School (286 students; grades K–5), 
Lyncrest Elementary School (263; K–5), 
Henry B. Milnes Elementary School (497; K–5), 
Radburn Elementary School (457; K–5), 
Warren Point Elementary School (469; K–5), 
Westmoreland Elementary School (422; K–5), 
Memorial Middle School (455; 6–8), 
Thomas Jefferson Middle School (739; 6–8) and 
Fair Lawn High School (1,490; 9–12).  In both the 1990–1991 and 1997–1998 school years, Fair Lawn High School received the National Blue Ribbon Award from the United States Department of Education, the highest honor that an American school can achieve. In 2016, Lyncrest Elementary School was one of ten schools in New Jersey recognized as a National Blue Ribbon School by the United States Department of Education, a recognition celebrating excellence in academics. Henry B. Milnes Elementary School was one of nine schools in New Jersey honored in 2020 by the National Blue Ribbon Schools Program.

In December 2014, Fair Lawn voters approved by a greater than 2-to-1 margin a $12.8 million expansion and capital improvement referendum to be implemented by the Fair Lawn Public Schools. The referendum funds the initiation within two years of a full-day kindergarten in the district,  a program offered by most districts countywide, as well as a roof replacement program at six schools. The expenditures will include $2.2 million in state aid, with the remaining $10.6 million covered by bonds issued by the school system. The full-day kindergarten program is slated to begin in September 2016.

Public school students from the borough, and all of Bergen County, are eligible to attend the secondary education programs offered by the Bergen County Technical Schools, which include the Bergen County Academies in Hackensack, and the Bergen Tech campus in Teterboro or Paramus. The district offers programs on a shared-time or full-time basis, with admission based on a selective application process and tuition covered by the student's home school district.

St. Anne School is a Catholic elementary school that operates under the supervision of the Roman Catholic Archdiocese of Newark.

Emergency services
Fair Lawn has an all-volunteer fire department. The department has four stations—Company 1 on George Street, 
Company 2 at Route 208 South (before Maple Avenue Bridge), 
Company 3 located at the corner of Plaza Road and Rosalie Street and 
Company 4 on Radburn Road. Fair Lawn residents are served by the all volunteer Fair Lawn Volunteer Ambulance, Inc., which provides 24/7 emergency medical services. This service is equipped with four state of the art ambulances stocked with all necessary supplies to handle any medical emergency. Fair Lawn is also served by the all-volunteer Fair Lawn Rescue Squad. The squad provides heavy rescue and hazardous materials (HAZMAT) services to the residents and businesses of the borough.

Fair Lawn also has a police department that was founded in 1930. In 2014, the department responded to over 400 calls.

Transportation

Roads
Fair Lawn is interwoven by a robust network of roads.

Fair Lawn is traversed by two state highways, New Jersey Route 4, which connects Fair Lawn to New York City via the George Washington Bridge, and New Jersey Route 208, which links Fair Lawn to the New York City bypass highway Interstate 287.

Fair Lawn has several main roads crossing through it forming a rough 3x3 grid. Running north–south are Saddle River Road, Plaza Road, and River Road (County Route 507) while Broadway, Morlot Avenue, and Fair Lawn Avenue run east–west, and Route 208 runs northwest–southeast. Running east–west between and parallel to Morlot and Fair Lawn Avenues is Berdan Avenue, a residential thoroughfare which is bisected by Route 208 into two discontinuous segments, the western one of which contains Fair Lawn High School.

Fair Lawn Avenue is considered the borough's main street, containing its borough hall, police station, and public library. The road goes west over the Passaic River into Paterson, and on the east, Fair Lawn Avenue ends at Saddle River Road, which through Dunkerhook Park becomes Dunkerhook Road, and becomes Century Road once in Paramus, at Paramus Road. The intersection of Fair Lawn Avenue and Plaza Road form what could be considered a "town center", with several shopping plazas and the Radburn train station all within walking distance. In October 2015, a community meeting was held to discuss a vision for this corridor. Other commercial areas include Broadway and River Road.

Route 208 has its southern terminus in Fair Lawn and bisects the borough from the northwest to the southeast, where it eventually merges with Broadway to become Route 4 just west of Fair Lawn's border with Paramus. Taken the other direction, Route 208 flows northwest to Interstate 287 in Oakland. Numerous commercial establishments and office buildings line Route 208 along the northwestern half of this limited access highway's trajectory through Fair Lawn.

South of Route 4, Saddle River Road goes through the eastern side of Fair Lawn and into Saddle Brook, where it provides a link to both the Garden State Parkway and Interstate 80.  North of Route 4, Saddle River Road provides a link to Glen Rock.

Grid-based address system

Fair Lawn uses a street address numbering system in which most Fair Lawn addresses are given hyphenated numbers. The address of the borough's public library, for example, is 10-01 Fair Lawn Ave. Less than 1% of addresses in New Jersey use this kind of numbering system and Fair Lawn's nearly 10,000 hyphenated addresses account for nearly half of them. This numbering system is also used in Queens, New York City. Exceptions to this numbering system generally exist on the Glen Rock, Hawthorne, and Saddle Brook sides of Fair Lawn and within the Radburn development. The system, dating at least as far back as the 1930s, was designed to allow emergency personnel to quickly locate addresses.

The first numbers (before the dash) correspond to block-distances from Broadway (on streets that run North-South) and to the numbered streets in the borough (example: 2nd Street, 17th Street, etc.) on the streets that run East-West; with the highest numbers being in the low 40s, and the lowest numbers being 0–30, etc. Addresses south of Broadway / Route 4 start with a zero and a hyphen, which can cause confusion with those unfamiliar with the grid system. Most GPS systems and online address entry forms do not accept the dash, though addresses entered without the dash are typically handled properly.

Public transportation

Fair Lawn is served by the Radburn and Broadway train stations on the NJ Transit Bergen County Line, which offers service to Lower Manhattan via the Hoboken Terminal, and connections at Secaucus Junction to Penn Station in Midtown Manhattan and to most other NJ Transit train lines.

NJ Transit buses include the 144, 145, 148, 160, 164 and 196 routes to the Port Authority Bus Terminal in Midtown Manhattan; the 171 and 175 to the George Washington Bridge Bus Terminal; and the 746, 758 and 770 lines, offering local service.

Spanish Transportation and its jitney buses / guaguas operate out of its terminal located one block from the NJ Transit Paterson Terminal on Broadway in downtown Paterson. The two lines, the Broadway and Main Street jitneys, begin at its respective Main Terminal on Broadway, with the Broadway-Washington Heights line heading west on Broadway with frequent local stops then continuing onto Route 4 before crossing the George Washington Bridge and dropping commuters off in front of the George Washington Bridge Bus Terminal with access to the A Train. The Main Street-42nd Street route heads south down Main Street and makes frequent local stops through Clifton and Passaic, then makes sporadic non-local stops until undergoing the Lincoln Tunnel, dropping commuters off via 42nd Street in front of the Port Authority Bus Terminal.

Aviation

Popular culture
 In the 1976 film Taxi Driver, when Travis Bickle (Robert De Niro) is talking to a Secret Service agent, he provides a false name (Henry Krinkle), and a false address (154 Hopper Avenue, Fair Lawn, New Jersey). There is a Hopper Avenue in Fair Lawn, but 154 Hopper Avenue does not exist, and the ZIP Code he provides is also incorrect (61045, which is actually in Kings, Illinois).
 In 1981 punk rock band The Misfits, who later became one of the original pioneers of hardcore punk, recorded their studio demo titled "The Fairlawn Sessions" at New Found Sound Studio with original singer Glen Danzig.
 In the 1996 Mel Gibson movie Ransom, Fair Lawn is seen when Gibson is told to turn from Route 4 onto Saddle River Road (Fair Lawn) and into the rock quarry (which is actually located in Haledon, New Jersey). 
 In the 2004 movie Taxi, Fair Lawn can be seen on the map that Detective Washburn (Jimmy Fallon) is reading. The map is fake, since it shows a fictional uncompleted highway off the Garden State Parkway in Oradell.
 At the beginning of the "Pine Barrens" episode of the television series The Sopranos, Mob boss Tony Soprano tells Paulie Walnuts and protege Christopher Moltisanti to visit a Russian mobster, Valery, in Fair Lawn. However, this scene was shot in Paterson. A scene in the episode "The Happy Wanderer" was filmed in front of the historic Radburn Building.
 Fair Lawn was featured in the movie The Other Guys starring Will Ferrell and Mark Wahlberg.  The two main characters travel to Fair Lawn, New Jersey to get accounting files.

Notable people

People who were born in, residents of, or otherwise closely associated with Fair Lawn include:

 Tom Acker (1930–2021), former Major League Baseball pitcher who played for the Cincinnati Reds
 Matt Ahearn (born 1959), former member of the New Jersey General Assembly who represented the 38th Legislative District from 2002–2004
 Ian Axel (born 1985), singer-songwriter, pianist, and member of the band A Great Big World
 Jeffrey Boam (1946–2000), screenwriter best known for Indiana Jones and the Last Crusade and Lethal Weapon 2 and 3
 Steve Bornstein (born 1952), President and CEO of the NFL Network
 Brendan Burke (born 1984), sportscaster for the Utica Comets
 Anthony Campanile (born 1982), linebackers coach for the Miami Dolphins and former defensive backs coach for Boston College
 Gérard Debaets (1899–1959), Belgian racing cyclist
 Russell Dermond (1936–2015), sprint canoer who competed in the 1956 and 1960 Olympics
 John E. Dohms (1948–2012), researcher of the pathology of avian diseases
 Barry Edelstein (born 1965), theatre director, author, and educator who serves as Artistic Director of the Old Globe Theatre in San Diego, California
 W. Cary Edwards (1944–2010), politician who served as the Attorney General of New Jersey from 1986 to 1989
 Steven Ehrlich (born 1946), architect who is the founding partner of the practice Ehrlich Yanai Rhee Chaney Architects, formerly known as Ehrlich Architects
 Tracy Eisser (born 1989), rower who won the gold medal in the quad sculls at the 2015 World Rowing Championships and competed at the Olympics
 Philip Ettinger (born 1985), actor known for his roles in First Reformed (2017), Tyrel (2018) and in the 2020 film The Evening Hour
 Donald Fagen (born 1948), singer-songwriter and co-founder and lead singer of Steely Dan
 Nicholas Felice (1927–2021), politician who served in the New Jersey General Assembly and was mayor of Fair Lawn
 Jim Finn (born 1976), football player with the New York Giants
 Helene Fortunoff (1933–2021), businessperson who headed Fortunoff.
 David Gewirtz, CNN columnist, cyberterrorism adviser and presidential scholar
 Robert M. Gordon (born 1950), member of the New Jersey Senate since 2008, who served in the New Jersey General Assembly from 2004–2008 and was mayor of Fair Lawn from 1988–1991
 Neal Gottlieb (born 1977), ice cream entrepreneur who founded Three Twins organic ice cream
 Boris Gulko (born 1947), International Grandmaster and former winner of the U.S. Chess Championship
 Larry Hochman (born 1953), orchestrator and composer who won four Emmy Awards for his original music on the TV series The Wonder Pets and a Tony Award for his orchestrations for The Book of Mormon
 Šaćir Hot (born 1991), soccer player for the New York Red Bulls, the United States U-20 team, and Boston College; attended Fair Lawn High School
 Allen Kay (born 1945), advertising executive
 Naomi Kutin (born ), world record-setting powerlifter
 Steve Malzberg (born 1959), radio host
 Antonio Matarazzo (born 1993), professional soccer midfielder who currently plays for Orlando City B in the USL
 Pellegrino Matarazzo (born 1977), professional soccer coach who is currently the manager of VfB Stuttgart
 Mike Meola (1905–1976), pitcher in Major League Baseball who played between the 1933 and 1936 seasons
 Lee Meredith (born 1947 as Judi-Lee Sauls), actress who appeared in The Producers, Hello Down There and The Sunshine Boys
 The Kid Mero (born 1983), Writer, comedian, TV personality, voice actor, YouTube personality, music blogger and Twitter personality
 Jillian Morgese (born 1989), actress
 Millie Perkins (born 1938), actress, who played the title role in her first film as the star of The Diary of Anne Frank
 Ron Perranoski (1936–2020), Major League Baseball pitcher from 1961-1973
 Philip Plotch (born 1961), author, professor and transportation planner
 Billy Price (born 1949), soul singer
 Maurice Purtill (1916–1994), drummer in the Big Band era, most notably the Glenn Miller Orchestra
 Sarah-Nicole Robles (born 1991), actress and voice actress, best known for providing the voice of Luz Noceda in the Disney Channel animated series The Owl House
 Roberta Rogow (born 1942), writer of speculative fiction and fan fiction, and a filk music singer-songwriter
 Steve Rothman (born 1952), Congressman who represented New Jersey's 9th congressional district from 1997–2013
 Ira Rubin (1930–2013), world champion professional contract bridge player
 C. Gus Rys (–1980), politician who was mayor of Fair Lawn and served three terms in the New Jersey General Assembly
 Amy Scheer, professional sports executive who is general manager of the Connecticut Whale of the Premier Hockey Federation
 Charlie Schlatter (born 1966), actor
 Loren Schoenberg (born 1958), jazz musician, conductor and educator who is founding director of the National Jazz Museum in Harlem
 Dave Sime (1936–2016), sprinter who won a silver medal in the 100m dash at the 1960 Summer Olympics in Rome
 Regina Spektor (born 1980), singer
 Brendan Suhr (born 1951), Director of Program Development for the UCF Knights men's basketball team and former NBA scout and assistant coach
 Steve Swallow (born 1940), jazz double bassist and bass guitarist
 Donna Vivino (born 1978), stage and screen actress, who has performed the starring role of Elphaba in the Broadway National Tour production of Wicked
 Reginald Weir (1911–1987), African-American tennis player and physician
 Julius Wiggins (1928–2001), publisher and founder of Silent News, the first newspaper for the deaf
 Ben Younger (born 1977), screenwriter and director of films including Boiler Room, Bleed for This and Prime
 Rabbi Benjamin Yudin (born 1944), Rabbi and founder of Congregation Shomrei Torah in Fair Lawn

Historic sites
The Passaic River Fishing Weir is a prominent archaeological feature just north of the Fair Lawn Avenue Bridge. It was constructed by Lenape tribe members and is the best-preserved of several such weirs on the Passaic River.

Fair Lawn is home to the following locations on the National Register of Historic Places:

 G. V. H. Berdan House – 1219 River Road (added 1983)
 Richard J. Berdan House – 24-07 Fair Lawn Avenue (added 1983): Purchased by Richard J. Berdan in 1808, the home was constructed for the Bogert family .
 Cadmus-Folly House – 19-21 Fair Lawn Avenue (added 1983)
 Peter Garretson House – 4-02 River Road (added 1974): With a homestead that dates back to 1719, the sandstone house is one of the oldest surviving structures in Bergen County. The Garretson Forge and Farm Restoration operates the site, owned by the county, as a farm museum.
 Naugle House – 42-49 Dunkerhook Road (added 1983): Constructed in 1776, the home was visited by the Marquis de Lafayette. The site was purchased by the borough in 2010 for $1.7 million, and a plan has been formulated to repair the home and preserve the grounds as open space.
 Radburn – Irregular pattern between Radburn Road and Erie RR. tracks (added 1975)
 Radburn station – Pollitt Drive (added 1984)
 Jacob Vanderbeck Jr. House – 41-25 Dunkerhook Road (added 1983): Constructed in Dutch stone by Jacob Vanderbeck in the 1750s, the house has had a number of prominent owners, including Fair Lawn mayor and Assemblyman Richard Vander Plaat. Owned by a developer who has sought to use the site to construct a large-scale assisted-living facility, the house has been listed on Preservation New Jersey's 2013 list of the 10 Most Endangered Historic Places in New Jersey.

Fair Lawn also has a close association with two historic areas along the Saddle River in Paramus. One is the Easton Tower, a Bergen County historic site that consists of a stone tower and a small dam which mark the site of the colonial-era Jacob Zabriskie mill and the 19th–20th centuries-era Arcola community park. Another is the Dunkerhook community, focused around the New Jersey designated historic road, Dunkerhook Road. The western section of the community includes the Naugle House and the Jacob Vanderbeck Jr. House, and the eastern section included a slave and free-African American community that consisted of a school, a cemetery, a church, and houses including the now-demolished Zabriskie Tenant House.

References

Further reading

 Municipal Incorporations of the State of New Jersey (according to Counties) prepared by the Division of Local Government, Department of the Treasury (New Jersey); December 1, 1958.
 Clayton, W. Woodford; and Nelson, Nelson. History of Bergen and Passaic Counties, New Jersey, with Biographical Sketches of Many of its Pioneers and Prominent Men. Philadelphia: Everts and Peck, 1882.
 Harvey, Cornelius Burnham (ed.), Genealogical History of Hudson and Bergen Counties, New Jersey. New York: New Jersey Genealogical Publishing Co., 1900.
 Van Valen, James M. History of Bergen County, New Jersey. New York: New Jersey Publishing and Engraving Co., 1900.
 Westervelt, Frances A. (Frances Augusta), 1858–1942, History of Bergen County, New Jersey, 1630-1923. Lewis Historical Publishing Company, 1923.

External links

 

 
1924 establishments in New Jersey
Boroughs in Bergen County, New Jersey
Faulkner Act (council–manager)
Populated places established in 1924
Russian-American culture in New Jersey
Russian communities in the United States
Ukrainian communities in the United States
Ukrainian-American culture in New Jersey